The 2007–08 season saw Dundee compete in the Scottish First Division after coming 3rd place the season prior. Dundee finished in 2nd position with 69 points, 7 points behind eventual league winners Hamilton Academical.

Final league table

Results 
Dundee's score comes first

Legend

Scottish First Division

Scottish Cup

Scottish League Cup

Scottish Challenge Cup

References

External links 

 Dundee 2007–08 at Soccerbase.com (select relevant season from dropdown list)

Dundee F.C. seasons
Dundee